Silvestre Manuel Gonçalves Varela (born 2 February 1985) is a Portuguese professional footballer who plays for FC Porto B as a winger.

He represented mainly Porto during his career, amassing Primeira Liga totals of 268 matches and 47 goals over 12 seasons and winning 11 major titles, including three national championships and the 2011 Europa League. He also competed professionally in Spain, England, Italy and Turkey.

Varela appeared for Portugal at Euro 2012 and the 2014 World Cup, scoring in both tournaments.

Club career

Sporting CP
A product of Sporting CP's youth system, Varela was born in Almada, Setúbal District, being loaned to Casa Pia A.C. and Vitória F.C. in his early years as a professional. Despite being a regular with the Portuguese under-21s and having enjoyed a decent form in various tournaments, he was not able to secure a place in the Lions first team, only managing two substitute appearances in the 2005–06 season.

In 2007–08, Varela, alongside former Sporting players Beto and Carlos Martins, played for Recreativo de Huelva in Spain (Varela on loan again). After a disappointing campaign despite having received playing time in La Liga, he returned to Sporting in July 2008 only to be immediately sold to C.F. Estrela da Amadora.

Porto
Before the season was over, in March 2009, courtesy of his solid performances at Estrela, only relegated from the Primeira Liga off the field, Varela signed a five-year agreement with champions FC Porto on a free transfer, starting in July. In his first year he ranked second in overall goals in the squad, only behind Radamel Falcao; in March 2010, however, he broke his fibula in training, being lost for the remainder of the campaign as the team finished third.

In 2011–12, under new manager Vítor Pereira, Varela – as practically all Portuguese players (the roster was composed of three nationals) – lost his importance in the side. On 16 February 2012, in a rare start, he put Porto ahead against Manchester City in the round of 32 of the UEFA Europa League, in an eventual 1–2 home loss.

Varela signed with Premier League side West Bromwich Albion on 24 August 2014, in a season-long loan deal. Having arrived whilst still recovering from injury, he made his official debut on 2 December, replacing Craig Gardner midway through the second half of a 1–2 home defeat to West Ham United. He scored his first goal for the Baggies on the 20th, but in a 3–2 loss at Queens Park Rangers.

On 20 January 2015, still owned by Porto, Varela joined struggling Serie A team Parma F.C. until June.

Kayserispor
Having made only seven appearances for Porto during the season, Varela, who was by then the club's longest serving player, ended his seven-and-a-half-year link on 20 January 2017 by signing for Turkey's Kayserispor. He and fellow veteran Asamoah Gyan were told at the end of their contracts in June 2018 that they would only be retained if they signed performance-based deals, due to their injury record.

Belenenses SAD
On 8 October 2019, having been a free agent, Varela returned to his country's top-flight by joining Belenenses SAD until the end of the campaign. The following July, he signed for another season and was made captain.

Return to Porto
Varela returned to Porto on 20 July 2021; the 36-year-old was brought to pass on experience and knowledge to the young players in the club's B team, who competed in the Liga Portugal 2. He scored in his very first match in the competition, a 2–2 home draw against newly promoted C.D. Trofense.

International career

Due to his Porto performances, Varela earned his first full cap for the Portugal national team on 3 March 2010, appearing in the second half of the 2–0 friendly win with China in a match played in Coimbra. His first goal came on 26 March 2011 in a 1–1 friendly draw against Chile, in Leiria.

Varela was selected by manager Paulo Bento for the 23-man squad that competed in UEFA Euro 2012. He played ten minutes in the group stage opener against Germany, in an eventual 0–1 loss. Again coming from the bench for Raul Meireles, he scored an 88th-minute 3–2 winner over Denmark in the following game.

On 19 May 2014, Varela was named in the final 23-man squad for the 2014 FIFA World Cup. On 23 June, again after having replaced Meireles, he headed home in the 94th minute to earn his team a 2–2 group stage draw against the United States.

Personal life
Varela's nephew Nilton is also a footballer, playing in defence. The pair were teammates at Belenenses SAD and Porto B.

Career statistics
Club

International

International goals
Scores and results list Portugal's goal tally first, score column indicates score after each Varela goal.

HonoursPortoPrimeira Liga: 2010–11, 2011–12, 2012–13
Taça de Portugal: 2009–10, 2010–11
Supertaça Cândido de Oliveira: 2009, 2010, 2011, 2012, 2013
UEFA Europa League: 2010–11Individual'
SJPF Young Player of the Month: January 2007, February 2007

References

External links

1985 births
Living people
Portuguese sportspeople of Cape Verdean descent
Sportspeople from Almada
Black Portuguese sportspeople
Portuguese footballers
Association football wingers
Primeira Liga players
Liga Portugal 2 players
Segunda Divisão players
Sporting CP B players
Sporting CP footballers
Casa Pia A.C. players
Vitória F.C. players
C.F. Estrela da Amadora players
FC Porto players
Belenenses SAD players
FC Porto B players
La Liga players
Recreativo de Huelva players
Premier League players
West Bromwich Albion F.C. players
Serie A players
Parma Calcio 1913 players
Süper Lig players
Kayserispor footballers
UEFA Europa League winning players
Portugal youth international footballers
Portugal under-21 international footballers
Portugal B international footballers
Portugal international footballers
UEFA Euro 2012 players
2014 FIFA World Cup players
Portuguese expatriate footballers
Expatriate footballers in Spain
Expatriate footballers in England
Expatriate footballers in Italy
Expatriate footballers in Turkey
Portuguese expatriate sportspeople in Spain
Portuguese expatriate sportspeople in England
Portuguese expatriate sportspeople in Italy
Portuguese expatriate sportspeople in Turkey